The Addis count is a urine test measuring urinary casts over time.

It is named for Thomas Addis.

References

Urine tests